A skein is a unit of length which has been used in the UK.
As a measuring unit of cotton yarn or of silk, a skein equates to a "rap" or a "lea".

References

Units of length
Customary units of measurement